Jaggulal Anshul (born 22 April 1988) is an Indian cricketer. He plays first-class cricket for Hyderabad.

See also
 List of Hyderabad cricketers

References

External links
 

1988 births
Living people
Indian cricketers
Hyderabad cricketers
Cricketers from Hyderabad, India